Rewan is a rural locality in the Central Highlands Region, Queensland, Australia.

History 
All 19 people aboard a Dakota C-47 aircraft were killed when it crashed at Rewan on 16 November 1943 during World War II.  Those killed consisted of 14 military personnel from the Australian Army and the Royal Australian Air Force along with five personnel from the United States Army Air Corp.  A memorial was erected near the crash site in 2004.

Road infrastructure
The Carnarvon Highway runs through from south to north.

Heritage listings 
Heritage-listed sites in Rewan include:

 Rewan Road: Rewan Police Horse Breeding Station

See also 
Rewan air crash

References 

Central Highlands Region
Localities in Queensland